The 1995 Calabrian regional election took place on 23 April 1995.

Giuseppe Nisticò (Forza Italia) was elected President of the Region, defeating Donato Tommaso Veraldi (People's Party).

For the first time the President of the Region was directly elected by the people, although the election was not yet binding and the President-elect could have been replaced during the term. This is precisely what happened in 1998, when the centre-right decided to replace Nisticò with Battista Caligiuri, and again in 1999, when a centre-left majority supported by dissidents of the centre-right, who had formed the Democratic Union for the Republic, ousted Caligiuri and replaced him with Luigi Meduri of the Italian People's Party.

Results

Source: Ministry of the Interior

Elections in Calabria
1995 elections in Italy